Zohreh Tabibzadeh-Nouri is an Iranian dentist and conservative politician who was formerly a member of the Parliament of Iran representing Tehran, Rey, Shemiranat and Eslamshahr.

She was appointed by Mahmoud Ahmadinejad as the head of Center for Women and Family Affairs.

References

1960 births
Living people
Members of the 9th Islamic Consultative Assembly
Deputies of Tehran, Rey, Shemiranat and Eslamshahr
Front of Islamic Revolution Stability politicians
Women dentists
Members of the Women's fraction of Islamic Consultative Assembly
Office for Strengthening Unity members
21st-century Iranian women politicians
21st-century Iranian politicians
Islamic Association of Physicians of Iran politicians